Gregory Ibe (born 10 December 1963) is a Nigerian industrialist and educationist. He is the chancellor of Gregory University, Uturu, Abia state and All Progressive Grand Alliance gubernatorial candidate for the 2023 Abia state Governorship election.

References 

Nigerian politicians
Living people
1963 births